Danian (also Romanized as Danīan, Danyān, Denīān, and Denyān) is a village in Alaviyeh Rural District, Kordian District, Jahrom County, Fars Province, Iran. At the 2006 census, its population was 266, in 74 families.

References 

Populated places in Jahrom County